Pujith Senadhi Bandara Jayasundara also simply known as Pujith Jayasundara (born 15 March 1960) is a former Sri Lankan police officer. He was the 34th Inspector-General of Police (IGP) from 2016 to 2020. He was sent on compulsory leave from April 2019 following the Easter bombings and retired in March 2020.

Early life and education 
Jayasundara was born 15 March 1960 in Kurunegala. He is the son of Ranbandara Jayasundara, who worked for an electronics and radio appliance manufacturing company in Colombo. He received his primary education at Thaksala Maha Vidyalaya in Mahamukalanyaya in Bogamuwa. At grade five, he was admitted to Ibbagamuwa Central School and then joined Dharmaraja College in Kandy in 1969 soon after. He graduated from University of Sri Jayewardenepura with a Bachelor of Commerce with a class of second upper.

Police career 
He joined the Sri Lanka Police in 1985 as a Probationary Assistant Superintendent of Police. He worked as a Senior Deputy Inspector General of Sri Lanka Police prior to his appointment as the IGP. He served as a police officer for 35 years until his retirement in 2020.

Jayasundara was appointed on 20 April 2016, recommended by the newly appointed Constitutional Council of Sri Lanka. He was chosen from among three Senior Deputy Inspector Generals of Police. The Constitutional Council approved his appointment. He was expected to prosecute cases against former President of Sri Lanka, Mahinda Rajapakse and his allies.

Easter bombings 
On the 26 April 2019 President Maithripala Sirisena ordered Jayasundara to resign over failures that led to the deadly Easter bomb attacks. Due to a lack of response from Jayasundara, he was put on compulsory leave with Senior DIG C. D. Wickramaratne appointed as the acting Inspector General.

However in a 20-page complaint Jayasundara claimed that there were serious communication gaps between intelligence agencies and security arms of the government, all which fall under Sirisena. He also stated that the State Intelligence Service (SIS) which reports directly to the president ordered him to stop ongoing police investigations into Islamic militants including the National Thowheeth Jama'ath (NTJ).

Jayasundara who was arrested along with Hemasiri Fernando, Secretary to the Ministry of Defence for failing prevent the Easter bombings. In February 2020, he was released on a cash bail of Rs 250,000. In March 2020, he retired from the police service and was approved to obtain his pension and retirement benefits

Notes

References

|-

|-

1960 births
Living people
Alumni of Dharmaraja College
Alumni of the University of Sri Jayewardenepura
People from North Western Province, Sri Lanka
Sinhalese police officers
Sri Lankan Inspectors General of Police